Trimyristin is a saturated fat and the triglyceride of myristic acid with the chemical formula C45H86O6. Trimyristin is a white to yellowish-gray solid that is insoluble in water, but soluble in ethanol, acetone, benzene, chloroform, dichloromethane, ether, and TBME.

Occurrence
Trimyristin is found naturally in many vegetable fats and oils.

Isolation from nutmeg

The isolation of trimyristin from powdered nutmeg is a common introductory-level college organic chemistry experiment. It is an uncommonly simple natural product extraction because nutmeg oil generally consists of over eighty percent trimyristin. Trimyristin makes up between 20-25% of the overall mass of dried, ground nutmeg. Separation is generally carried out by steam distillation and purification uses extraction from ether followed by distillation or rotary evaporation to remove the volatile solvent. The extraction of trimyristin can also be done with diethyl ether at room temperature, due to its high solubility in the ether.  The experiment is frequently included in curricula, both for its relative ease and to provide instruction in these techniques.

See also
 Linolein

References

Triglycerides